is a fictional character from Re:Zero − Starting Life in Another World, a series of light novels written by Tappei Nagatsuki and illustrated by Shin'ichirō Ōtsuka.  Subaru is a young hikikomori who suddenly finds himself transported to another world on his way home from the convenience store. While dealing with the new society, he also encounters catastrophes that result in his death, though he is always revived to a point in time where he can make substantial changes. Using this  ability, Subaru searches for a way to protect his newly found friends. Aside from the anime and video games based on the series, Subaru also appears in the gag series Isekai Quartet.

Nagatsuki originally wrote a web novel in 2013 involving Subaru's ability, which impressed his superiors and asked him to write the light novels. Ōtsuka's first sketch of the character was rejected due to the writer's fear of making him unlikable. In the anime adaptation of the series, Subaru is voiced by Yūsuke Kobayashi in Japanese and Sean Chiplock in English.

Subaru has been a popular character in Japan and won for "Best Character (Male)" at the Newtype Anime Awards. Despite early mixed reception to Subaru's characterization in the narrative, anime and manga critics have praised the handling of his stress and the way he overcomes it in a heroic manner, making him a likable protagonist.

Creation and development

The series' editor at MF Bunko J, Masahito Ikemoto, first became aware of the web novel in April 2013 when it began to appear on his Twitter feed.  He was immediately impressed by the series' use of Subaru's Return by Death, and how it was a "depressing, yet surprising, twist on the fantasy genre" before he began working with Nagatsuki to adapt the series into a light novel.

Nagatsuki conceived of Return by Death under the assumption that it would help the main character become stronger with each use before changing his mind. Instead, he decided to develop Subaru through the latter's deaths. Nagatsuki decided to explore Subaru's deaths in the light novel as he found this concept to be rarely explored in other series. In order to keep the narrative entertaining, Nagatsuki gives Subaru a challenge with every Return by Death and subjects him to gruesome experiences, such as the time where he is eaten by animals. Subaru was created to be a young man assisting a silver-haired girl. While the first original video animation of the series focused on Subaru's attempts to save the world, the second one aimed to bring a parallel with Emilia's quest happening at the same time.

Illustrator Shin'ichirō Ōtsuka submitted a number of character designs for the major characters to Ikemoto. Subaru's initial design made him look like a delinquent, with Ōtsuka later describing it as "not the face of a boy in his teens". Ikemoto requested that the character be "more friendly and less fierce" so that the audience could empathize with him during emotional scenes. After joining the project, Yoshiko Nakamura and scriptwriter Eiji Umehara had to readjust their views of the main character and rewrite scenes where they had made Subaru appear "cool". At Masaharu Watanabe's direction, Nakamura had to rewrite Subaru's telling of The Red Ogre Who Cried in episode 6 multiple times.

Voice actors
Yūsuke Kobayashi voices Subaru in the Japanese version. He initially believed the series was a romantic comedy. However, upon reading more of the narrative, Kobayashi was attracted by the series. He describes Subaru as a character who tries his best to avoid a negative future thanks to his Return by Death ability. As a result, he views his character more as a cheerful teenager despite the threats he faces. Kobayashi recalls being surprised as he was immediately cast for the role once the staff heard his voice. When Kobayashi was preparing he said "Isn't this too many lines for an anime?!" based on the multiple moods he had to portray, which led him to being exhausted during recording sessions. During initial episodes, Kobayashi befriended Puck's actor Yumi Uchiyama who supported him.

Sean Chiplock voiced the character in the English dub of the series. Chiplock found Subaru as an energetic character with a sense of justice, comparing his personality with that of Jin-Mori, the protagonist of The God of High School.

Appearances

Re:Zero − Starting Life in Another World
Subaru is the main protagonist of the series; he is a 17-year-old NEET who is suddenly transported to another world on his way home from the convenience store. There, he meets a silver-haired half-elf girl named Emilia and falls deeply in love with her. Upon his arrival, Subaru acquires an ability which he calls "Return by Death", which allows him to go back in time when he dies while retaining his memories of the previous timelines. He cannot tell anyone about this ability, because any attempt to do so causes him to black out momentarily as unseen hands emerge to squeeze his heart, and may even kill those around him; it also causes him to give off the "scent of the Jealous Witch", which attracts "mabeasts" (magical creatures), and is repulsive to those who can detect it.

After Subaru is injured in a public fight with Julius, he gets into a huge argument with Emilia, who decides to cut ties with Subaru and leaves him behind. Knowing that the mansion and village will be attacked, Subaru seeks help from the other royal candidates, but they all decline. While gathering an evacuation team, he encounters a legendary beast called the White Whale. After respawning, Subaru, having fallen into utter despair, has a serious conversation with Rem and asks her to run away with him. Rem, however, strongly encourages Subaru not to give up and confesses her love for him, already knowing that his heart is for Emilia. With newfound resolve, Subaru then decides that he will start again from zero. Subaru and Rem later battle against the White Whale after successfully striking an alliance with Crusch and Anastasia's camps. Wilhelm kills the White Whale. After reconciling with Emilia, Subaru confesses his love for her, leading Emilia to tearfully thank Subaru for saving her. However, when Subaru questions his confession regarding Rem, Emilia gave no recollection of Rem for the second time, much to Subaru's shock. Regardless of attempts to travel back in time through suicide, Subaru is unable to restore everybody's memory of Rem whom he finds in a catatonic state.

In Arc 3, he officially receives a black ground dragon named Patrasche as his personal steed. In Arc 4 of the web novel, he enters into a contract with Beatrice and learns parkour and the use of whips as a weapon. As of the end of Arc 4, Subaru officially becomes Emilia's knight.

Other appearances
Subaru also appears in the mobile game Re:Zero − Starting Life in Another World: Lost in Memories, which features branching paths that lead Subaru Natsuki to a different outcome of the story, turning into a "What if" scenario. The visual novel based on the series, titled Re:Zero -Starting Life in Another World- Death or Kiss, tells an original story that differs from the light novel and the anime, and allows the player to choose between routes featuring Emilia, Rem, Ram, Felt, Beatrice, Crusch, Priscilla, or Anastasia. Subaru has also made an appearance in the tactical-adventure video game Re:Zero − Starting Life in Another World: The Prophecy of the Throne. He stars in the crossover comedy series Isekai Quartet where the cast of Re:Zero interact with other isekai series in a school.

Reception
The character won the Best Character (Male) award in the 2015–2016 Newtype Anime Awards. In a poll by Crunchyroll, Subaru, with 2,246 votes, was voted as the second best Re:Zero character after Rem. In the Crunchyroll 2020 awards, Yūsuke Kobayashi won the category of best male seiyuu for his role as Subaru. FandomSpot author R. Romero ranked him as the best Isekai protagonist in anime, citing him as a subversion of an Isekai protagonist due to the several challenges he faces.

Critical reception to Subaru in the light novels has been mixed. At Anime News Network, Theron Martin lauded the series for being a somewhat fresher take on the "transported to another world" concept, but leveled criticism at it for bumpy and awkwardly timed dialogue and a tendency for redundancy, making Subaru come across as unlikable. In the next volume of the series, Rebecca Silverman praised Subaru's use of Return by Death to save the people he cares. Kim Morrissy regarded Subaru's traits as unique within the isekai genre as a rather than accomplishing tasks with ease, he suffers from multiple traumas that lead to self-loathing.

Andy Hanley from UK Anime Network considered the usage of Subaru's death scenes in the anime adaptation as one of the most unique elements from the series due to how the narrative takes uses it to reexamine the cast, most notably Subaru. He described Subaru as "a very flawed and very human character, whose personality and reactions are very distinctly coloured by the events he's witnessed and taken part in." Anime Now had mixed feelings towards Subaru; they regarded him as a "genre-savvy character" as while he might have common traits from other characters, his character arc make him highly complex. The Fandom Post enjoyed Subaru's gradual accomplishments in the anime despite his weak initial portrayal as by the ninth episode, he obtains Ram's trust while discovering the shaman's identity. THEM Anime Reviews has a negative impression of Subaru and criticized the impulsive demeanor Subaru has due to his quick actions as well as his persistent use of Return by Death which reduced the tension from the anime. They also describe him as the "antithesis" of Kirito due to Subaru's poor life contrasting against the latter. The reviewers note that the character arc had a notable development in the anime, and point out a scene where Subaru has a deep conversation with Rem which helps him become more likable.

In another article centered around Subaru, Manga.Tokyo compared the differences between the light novel and the anime based on how he deals with a suicide in order to undo Ram's death; the direction from the anime showing Subaru's psychological state and the way his suicide was highly praised for making his suicide look more realistic than the original printed version. Manga.Tokyo notes that Subaru's attempts at saving others through his own deaths made the Japanese audience appreciate him more. The writer feels Subaru's deaths were gruesome and compared them to Puella Magi Madoka Magica's. The site also compared Subaru with Konosubas main character Kazuma Sato due to their similar situations as they find themselves in different worlds. However, rather than focusing on quests like other isekai stories, the two series are more character-driven. The similarities between Subaru and Kazuma led to more parallelism in Isekai Quartet which Anime News Network found hilarious. Crunchyroll also stated that despite the multiple attention given to romances involving Subaru with other characters, his relationship with Emilia proved to be more appealing based on Subaru's progression as a character and the mutual help they give each other, something which other couples failed to deliver.

References

Literary characters introduced in 2014
Subaru Natsuki
Fantasy anime and manga characters
Fictional Japanese people in anime and manga
Male characters in anime and manga
Teenage characters in anime and manga
Anime and manga characters who use magic
Fictional amputees
Fictional attempted suicides
Fictional butlers
Fictional characters displaced in time
Fictional characters granted magic or power through dealings
Fictional characters who can manipulate darkness or shadows
Fictional characters with death or rebirth abilities
Fictional characters with post-traumatic stress disorder
Fictional knights
Fictional murdered people
Fictional traceurs and freerunners
Fictional whip users